The 2009–10 IFA Championship (known as the Ladbrokes.com Championship for sponsorship reasons) was the second season since its establishment after a major overhaul of the league system in Northern Ireland. It also marked the first season in which the Championship was divided into two divisions, with the clubs in both divisions having intermediate status. Championship 1 served as the second tier of Northern Irish football, with Championship 2 as the third tier.

In Championship 1, Loughgall were crowned champions on 8 May 2010 after a 2–0 win over Ards. However, they were denied promotion because they did not gain the required licence from the IFA. Therefore, runners-up Donegal Celtic entered into a two-leg play-off with the bottom club of the 2009–10 IFA Premiership, and achieved promotion with a 1–0 aggregate win. At the other end of the table, Coagh United and Armagh City finished in the bottom two, and were relegated to Championship 2 for next season.

In Championship 2, Harland & Wolff Welders won the title by 7 points, achieving promotion to Championship 1. Also promoted were Dergview who finished as runners-up. There was no relegation from Championship 2 this season.

Team changes from 2008–09
The 2008–09 Championship consisted of one division of 17 clubs. The bottom 3 clubs (Tobermore United, Killymoon Rangers and Dergview) were relegated to the newly introduced Championship 2 for this season. Championship 2 was set up to replace the IFA Interim Intermediate League, introduced as a temporary league for the 2008–09 season only, consisting of the former members of the IFA Intermediate League (dissolved in 2008) who did not meet the criteria for the new IFA Championship 2; it consisted of 12 clubs. Members of the Interim League had one year to make improvements in order to gain entry to Championship 2 for this season.

10 of the 12 clubs managed to meet the criteria, along with Sport & Leisure Swifts and Knockbreda who both achieved intermediate status, with only Brantwood and Oxford United Stars failing to do so. Harland & Wolff Welders were the champions. There was no promotion from the Interim League which meant that Championship 1 would be reduced to 14 clubs, with Championship 2 having 15.

Portadown were promoted to the 2009–10 IFA Premiership as 2008–09 Championship winners. Bangor entered Championship 1 after they announced that due to financial problems, they would not be able to renew their domestic licence required to take part in the Premiership.

Championship 1

League table

Results
Each team played every other team twice (once at home, and once away) for a total of 26 games.

Championship 2

League table

Results
Each team played every other team twice (once at home, and once away) for a total of 28 games.

References

NIFL Championship seasons
North
2009–10 in Northern Ireland association football